Lee Chang-ho (born 29 July 1975 in Jeonju, North Jeolla) is a South Korean professional Go player of 9-dan rank. He is regarded by many as the best Go player of the late 1990s and early 2000s. He was a student of Cho Hun-hyun 9-dan. He is the second youngest (11 years 1 month) to become a professional Go player in South Korean history behind Cho Hun-hyun (9 years 7 months). He is the only player to have won all eight international competitions at least once.

Biography
He turned professional in 1986 at the young age of 11. By the early 1990s, he started winning titles that his teacher, Cho, had won. By 1992 Lee had already won his first international title, which was the 3rd Tong Yang Cup. Lee has won all of the international Go tournaments at least twice, excluding the World Oza and Ing Cup, which are held every two and four years respectively. He is only the second player to record a "Grand Slam". The first was Cho Hunhyun. In 2006, Lee won the Wangwi title for the eleventh straight year. His teacher, Cho Hunhyun, holds the record for the most successive domestic titles with sixteen consecutive Paewang titles. Ma Xiaochun has the second-most successive domestic titles with thirteen Mingren titles.

Style
"Stone Buddha" is one of Lee's many nicknames. It derives from the fact that he always keeps a straight face and never smiles or frowns during a match. The nickname reflects his playing style as well. His reading ability is among the best in the world. This gives him an honorable nickname, "God of calculation." He does not attack as a general strategy and never plays "wild Go". Instead, he aims for only slightly superior positions where he can win without taking on unnecessary risks. He often wins by making his opponents think they are playing even with him or even winning, only to defeat them in the later stages of the game gradually. He rarely kills large groups or makes a single move that decides the match. His endgame skill is one of the strongest in history, and has resulted in countless wins by a small margin in top-level tournaments.

When confronted with the newer and more dangerous style of players such as Lee Sedol and Choi Cheol-han in the 2000s, Chango adjusted and changed his style to be more aggressive, remaining a dominant player throughout the decade.

Go career
Over the years, Lee's style of play has been broken down. Even Cho Chikun said that Lee Sedol would eventually pass Chang-ho because Chang-ho's style is no longer guaranteed due to the new generation of players. He has had to resort to abandoning his old style and improvising play against these new players. When asked if Lee's era was over, his teacher Cho Hunhyun simply replied, "No". He continued, saying that Lee Sedol is just someone who has finally fit the description of a rival for Chang-ho. He also said that both will battle many times and in the coming years the "smoke will settle" and one of them will come out on top.

After losing the 10th Samsung Cup to Luo Xihe, Lee came back and took the newly made Sibdan Cup against Park Young-Hoon. This was payback to Park, who had beat Lee in the 1st Prices Information Cup. Lee also won the 49th edition of Korea's oldest title, the Guksu. Unusually for him, Lee lost three times in 2006 representing Korea in international tournaments. First in the Nongshim Cup, then in the newly created Kangwon-Land Cup, and finally in the Asian TV Cup. This is a change for Lee, considering he has won 17 international tournaments over the past 14 years. In the final match of the 11th Samsung Cup, Lee lost 0-2 to Chang Hao of China. This was the second year in a row Lee lost the Samsung Cup.

In March 2007, the barely 19-year-old Yun Junsang beat title holder Lee Chang-ho 3-1 for the 50th Guksu title, but Lee got his revenge in July, beating Yun 3-2 to retain his Wangwi title.

Although not having had a successful year internationally, he was the highest earner in South Korea for 2006.

Personal life
Lee married the former amateur Go player Lee Do-yoon on 28 October 2010. Their daughter was born on 8 March 2012.

Titles and runners-up
Ranks #2 in total number of titles in Korea and #1 in international titles.

See also
Go players
List of Koreans

References

External links
 Official website 
 Interview
 Sensei's Library page

1975 births
Living people
People from Jeonju
South Korean Go players
Asian Games medalists in go
Go players at the 2010 Asian Games
Asian Games gold medalists for South Korea
Medalists at the 2010 Asian Games
Sportspeople from North Jeolla Province